Askew is an unincorporated community in Panola County, Mississippi. Askew is home to the 4,300 acre Askew Wildlife Management Area.

References

Unincorporated communities in Panola County, Mississippi
Unincorporated communities in Mississippi